Wawa River refers to:
 Wawa River (Nicaragua), a river in the North Caribbean Coast Autonomous Region of Nicaragua
 Wawa River (Agusan del Sur), a tributary of the Agusan River in the southern Philippines
 Wawa River, a tributary of the Marikina River, in the Rizal province of the Philippines